State Road 545 (NM 545) is a  state highway in the US state of New Mexico. NM 545's western terminus is at U.S. Route 54 (US 54) north of Alamogordo, and the eastern terminus is at the end of state maintenance at an intersection with Main Street and La Luz Road in La Luz.

Major intersections

See also

References

545
Transportation in Otero County, New Mexico